Galápagos turtle may refer to:

 Galápagos green turtle, the green sea turtle population found around the Galápagos Islands, sometimes considered to be a subspecies
 Galápagos tortoise a large species of tortoise native to the Galápagos Islands
 Species of the Galápagos tortoises

Animal common name disambiguation pages